The Diario Oficial is the official gazette of the Government of Uruguay that contains the laws, decrees, acts, and most pertinent documents and public notices of the President, Parliament, and government agencies of Uruguay. 

First published in 1905, the Diario Oficial is printed by the National Printing Office (IMPO).

References

External links

1905 establishments in Uruguay
Publications established in 1905 
Newspapers published in Uruguay
Uruguay
Government of Uruguay